Roméite is a calcium antimonate mineral with the chemical formula . It is a honey-yellow mineral crystallizing in the hexoctahedral crystal system. It has a Mohs hardness of 5.5-6.0.  It occurs in Algeria, Australia, Brazil, China, Europe, Japan, New Zealand, and the United States in metamorphic iron-manganese deposits and in hydrothermal antimony-bearing veins.

Its type locality is Prabornaz Mine, Saint-Marcel, Aosta Valley, Italy.  It was named after Jean-Baptiste L. Romé de l'Isle.  Brugger, et al. (1997) used infrared spectroscopy to measure water content in Roméite crystals.

References

Further reading
Brugger, J., R. Gieré, Stefan Graeser, Nicolas Meisser, The crystal chemistry of roméite, Contributions to Mineralogy and Petrology, Volume 127, Numbers 1-2 / March, 1997, pp. 136–146
Dana, James Dwight (1853) Manual of Mineralogy: Including Observations on Mines, Rocks, Reduction of Ores and the Application of the Science to the Arts, Durrie and Peck (5th edition), p. 303
romeine. (n.d.). Webster's Revised Unabridged Dictionary. Retrieved March 24, 2008, from Dictionary.com website: http://dictionary.reference.com/browse/romeine
Webmineral data
Mindat with location data
Atencio, D., Andrade, M. B., Christy, A. G., Gieré, R., & Kartashov, P. M. (2010). The pyrochlore supergroup of minerals: nomenclature. The Canadian Mineralogist, 48(3), 673-698.doi: 10.3749/canmin.48.3.673

Oxide minerals
Calcium minerals